El Estadio de Los Inmigrantes (The Immigrants Stadium) gained its name from its proximity to the port zone of Avellaneda to which immigrants arrived in search of a better life, many of them originating from Europe but with a large number also coming from places such as the Cape Verde Islands.

The stadium is the home ground of Club Sportivo Dock Sud a club that currently plays in the Primera C Metropolitana of the Argentine Football Association league system.

The current capacity of the stadium is 5,000 and the club has almost completed the construction of a new popularstanding section that will have given the stadium a new capacity of around 7,800. 

Address: Avenida Agustin Debenedetti, 2005, Dock Sud, Avellaneda, Buenos Aires Province, Argentina. 

Buses to the stadium: 33 - 54 - 134 -159 - 186

References 

https://web.archive.org/web/20090625013129/http://www.ascensoya.com/equipo.php?p_idequipo=56&p_nombre=Primera%20C&p_categoria=3&p_equipo=Dock%20Sud

http://geostadia.blogspot.com/2007/04/love-death-and-adventure-in-buenos_10.html

https://web.archive.org/web/20090415072408/http://www.csdocksud.com.ar/paginas/elClub/estadio.php

"Buenos Aires negra. Identidad y Cultura", Comision para la Preservacion del Patrimonio Historico Cultural de la Ciudad de Buenos Aires.

Sport in Avellaneda
Sports venues in Buenos Aires Province